The Vintgar Gorge or Bled Gorge is a  gorge in northwestern Slovenia in the municipalities of Gorje and Bled, four kilometers northwest of Bled. Carved by the Radovna River, it is the continuation of the Radovna Valley. The stream has created many erosive features such as pools and rapids, and terminates in the picturesque  Šum Falls (literally, 'noisy falls'), the largest river waterfall in Slovenia.

History

Until 1890, the gorge was mainly inaccessible, except for two points at which the Radovna could be reached, and a bridge over Šum Falls was already built in 1878. The rest of the gorge was explored in 1891 by the mayor of Gorje, Jakob Žumer, and by Benedikt Lergetporer, a prominent photographer of the era.

In 1893 the gorge was equipped with wooden observation walkways and bridges with great effort and was opened to the public on August 26, 1893. The walkways, which were later named Žumer Galleries in the most prominent part of the gorge, have been renovated several times since.

A hydroelectric dam has also been built below the gorge and an arch railway bridge for the Bohinj Railway. The bridge, built in 1904 and 1905 of cut stone, is the largest stone arch railway bridge preserved in its entirety in Slovenia.

Name
The word vintgar is derived from German Windegg(er) 'place exposed to the wind' via the hamlet of Vintgar at the head of the gorge in the village of Podhom. Another explanation claims that it derives from the German name Weingarten 'vineyard', referring to vineyards in Podhom or to the gorge resembling a wine glass in shape.

Geology
Before the last ice age, the Radovna River flowed eastward. After being dammed by the ice and detritus of the Bohinj Glacier, the resulting lake cut a new path northeast through a soft layer of Triassic limestone between the hills Boršt and Hom, towards the Upper Sava Valley.

References

External links
 
 Vintgar Gorge at the Bled municipal website
Vintgar 

Triglav National Park
Tourist attractions in Slovenia
Canyons and gorges of Slovenia
Municipality of Bled
Municipality of Gorje
Landforms of Upper Carniola
Articles containing video clips